Efim Grigoryevich Kolbintsev (18 January 1875, Orenburg Governorate — after 1917) was a peasant, a treasurer, a merchant and a deputy of the Fourth Imperial Duma from Orenburg Governorate between 1912 and 1917. December 3, 1913 he was a member of a group of 39 parliamentarians who signed the Duma legislative proposal "On the establishment of a special spiritual administration (muftiate) for the Muslims of the North Caucasus." During the February Revolution of 1917, he carried out various assignments of the Provisional Committee of the State Duma.

Literature 
 Николаев А. Б. Колбинцев Ефим Григорьевич (in Russian) // Государственная дума Российской империи: 1906—1917 / Б. Ю. Иванов, А. А. Комзолова, И. С. Ряховская. — Москва: РОССПЭН, 2008. — P. 261. — 735 p. — .
 Колбинцев (in Russian) // Члены Государственной думы (портреты и биографии): Четвертый созыв, 1912—1917 г. / сост. М. М. Боиович. — Москва: Тип. Т-ва И. Д. Сытина, 1913. — P. 210. — LXIV, 454, [2] p. 
 Законодательное предположение об учреждении особого духовного управления (муфтиата) для мусульман Северного Кавказа // Ab Imperio. — 2011. — № 4. — P. 279—284. — DOI:10.1353/imp.2011.0005. (in Russian)

Kolbintsev
1875 births
Year of death missing
People from Orenburg Governorate